Lake Muskoka East (Milford Bay) Water Aerodrome  is located west of Bracebridge, Ontario, Canada.

See also
 List of airports in the Bracebridge area

References

Registered aerodromes in Ontario
Transport in Bracebridge, Ontario
Seaplane bases in Ontario